Bandy at the 2011 Asian Winter Games was held at Medeu in Almaty, Kazakhstan.

Medalists

Squads

Results 
All times are Almaty Time (UTC+06:00)

Preliminaries

Final

References

External links
Official website

 
Asian Winter Games
2011
2011 Asian Winter Games events
International bandy competitions hosted by Kazakhstan